This is a list of students' associations in Ontario, Canada:

Universities

In addition to university-wide student unions that represent all students, or all students based on enrolment status (undergraduate, graduate, or part-time), there are some universities with faculty-specific student unions. These include Arts and Science Students’ Union (ASSU) at the University of Toronto and Arts and Science Undergraduate Society (ASUS) at Queen's University.

Federated Universities and Colleges
Federated universities and colleges are affiliated with larger institutions, but maintain their own autonomy and are governed as separate universities by their own provincial Acts.

Federated university student unions include: 
 Laurentian University / Université Laurentienne: 
Université de Hearst—Association des étudiantes et étudiants de l’Université de Hearst
 University of Ottawa / Université d'Ottawa: 
Saint Paul University / Université Saint-Paul—Saint Paul University Student Association
 University of Toronto: 
University of St. Michael's College—St. Michael's College Student Union
Trinity College—Trinity College Meeting
Victoria University—Victoria University Students’ Administrative Council
 University of Waterloo: 
St. Jerome's University—Students' Union of St. Jerome's University
 University of Western Ontario: 
Brescia University College—Brescia University College Students' Council
Huron University College—Huron Students' Council

OUSA
The undergraduate students' associations of Brock University, Laurentian University, McMaster University, Queen’s University, Trent University Durham Campus, the University of Waterloo, Wilfrid Laurier University, and the University of Western Ontario make up the Ontario Undergraduate Student Alliance.

CFS-Ontario
The Canadian Federation of Students—Ontario represents 35 student unions in Ontario.

Colleges

College Student Alliance (CSA)
The student associations of Cambrian, Centennial, Conestoga, Confederation, Durham, Fleming, Georgian, Northern, Sault, St. Clair, St. Lawrence colleges make up the College Student Alliance.

Secondary schools

References

See also
Canadian Alliance of Student Associations
Canadian Federation of Students
Ontario Undergraduate Student Alliance
College Student Alliance
List of Canadian students' associations